Francis Wallace Cope (November 19, 1915 – October 8, 1990) was an American football offensive tackle in the National Football League for the New York Giants.  He attended Santa Clara University. Cope played in 98 games while starting 61 of them. He played in six playoff games for the Giants (1938, 1939, 1941, 1943, 1944, 1946).

Cope is one of ten players that were named to the National Football League 1930s All-Decade Team that have not been inducted into the Pro Football Hall of Fame.

1915 births
1990 deaths
American football offensive guards
American football offensive tackles
New York Giants players
People from Anaconda, Montana